Coleophora libanella is a moth of the family Coleophoridae.

References

libanella
Moths described in 1994